Yanliang District is one of nine districts of Xi'an, the capital of Shaanxi province, China. The northernmost and least-populous of Xi'an's county-level divisions, it borders the prefecture-level cities of Xianyang to the west and Weinan to the northeast and Lintong District to the south.

Yanliang District is home to the Xi'an Aircraft Industrial Corporation, a subsidiary of the Chinese state-owned aircraft manufacturing company AVIC. The company is involved in major military and civilian aircraft projects and operates an airfield on the company campus for aircraft testing and internal transportation. Entry into the campus as heavily restricted because of its heavy involvement with state and military information.

Aircraft manufacturing is the most prominent industry in Yanliang, and serves as one of its biggest, if not the biggest source of employment.

History
Yanliang District was the site of the Qin capital of Yueyang.

Administrative divisions
As of 2020, Yanliang District  is divided to 10 subdistricts.
Subdistricts

References

Districts of Xi'an